Thomas Andrew (19 January 1855 – 7 August 1939) was a New Zealand photographer who lived in Samoa from 1891 until his death in 1939.

Andrew took photographs that are of significant historical and cultural value including the recording on camera of key events in Samoa's colonial era such as the Mau movement, the volcanic eruption of Mt Matavanu (1905–1911) and the funeral of writer Robert Louis Stevenson.

Many of his surviving images are held in the collections of the Museum of New Zealand Te Papa Tongarewa and include landscapes and studio portraits of Samoans that went beyond the colonial stereotypes of the time.

Andrew was born in Takapuna, a suburb in Auckland on the North Island of New Zealand. He worked as a photographer in Napier. He later opened a studio in Auckland which was destroyed by fire.  In 1891, he went to Samoa where he worked with two other New Zealand photographers, Alfred John Tattersall and John Davis. He died in Apia, the capital of Samoa.

Gallery

References

External links 
 Works by Thomas Andrew in the collection of Auckland War Memorial Museum
 Works by Thomas Andrew in the collection of the Museum of New Zealand Te Papa Tongarewa

New Zealand photographers
History of Samoa
Photography in Samoa
1855 births
1939 deaths
People from Takapuna
Photographers from Auckland